Dunlavin is a village in County Wicklow, Ireland, situated about  south-west of Dublin. It is centred on the junction of the R412 and R756 regional roads. It was founded around the end of the 17th century and became a prominent town in the area for a time.

Rathsallagh House Golf & Country Club and the Wicklow National Park are both nearby. Dunlavin is also close to the Curragh and Punchestown racecourses in County Kildare. Dunlavin's unusually wide streets are characteristic of the village with the Market Square measuring 108ft across at its widest point. It ranks as one of the widest village squares in Ireland. The village is known for the Market House which stands in the centre of the Market Square, which was built c.1740. The Dunlavin Festival of Arts, which is held each year in late June, has been running since 1982.

History
The settlement of Dunlavin was founded during the late 1650s by the Bulkely family from Cheshire (occasionally and erroneously referred to as "Buckley"). In 1702, Heather Bulkely married James Worth-Tynte and started the long association of the Tynte family with Dunlavin.

In 1777 the Dunlavin Light Dragoons were founded as a Volunteer corps, which was raised to defend Ireland from French invasion.

The Dunlavin Green executions occurred in 1798. The Catholic Church (dedicated to St Nicholas of Myra) was built on adjacent land donated by the local Tynte family.  The church dates from 1815, although Catholic worship was observed on the site prior to this.

Education
There are local schools: Jonathan Swift National School (primary, with a Church of Ireland ethos), St. Nicholas of Myra National School (primary, with a Catholic ethos), St. Kevin's Community College (secondary and vocational) and a preschool located beside Jonathan Swift National School.

Historic buildings and places

Market house
The Market House in the centre of the village, built in the Doric style of Grecian architecture, was built c.1740 to designs by Richard Cassels, one of the greatest architects working in Ireland in the 18th century. The landlord of the area, Sir James Worth Tynte, reputedly paid £1,200 for its construction. The building is set on an 'island' which bisects the R412 in the centre of Market Square. For a time the Market House was the centre of economic activity in the village and surrounding hinterland, making ample use of the generous proportions of the Market Square which allowed for cattle dealing and trading. The building was temporarily used as a jail during the 1798 Rebellion and was later repurposed as a courthouse during the 1830s. As of 2022, the Market House is currently in use as the village library.

Fairgreen
Dunlavin fairgreen is thought to date from the mid-seventeenth century and formed the south-eastern boundary of the original village. Fairs were held in the green from 1661. The area is best known for the Dunlavin Green executions that took place on 24 May 1798 at the beginning of the 1798 Rebellion. Thirty-six prisoners were taken from the Market House and summarily executed on the green without trial. Up to nine others were also hanged from the pillars of the Market House. The majority of the corpses were not claimed or removed on the day of the massacre and were taken to the nearby location of Tournant that evening and buried in a large pit. Fairs continued on the green until the 1960s, when cattle marts took over the principal function of fairs in rural Irish society. The Tynte Estate gifted the fairgreen to the people of Dunlavin in 2021.

St. Nicholas’ holy well
A holy well exists on the slopes of Tornant moat to the south of the village and is dedicated to Saint Nicholas. 'Patterns' were the name of rituals that were routinely performed by pilgrims when visiting such sites and involved walking a prescribed circular clockwise journey around a holy well. The "Tournant pattern" at St. Nicholas’ holy well was traditionally held in late June each year. Patterns became social occasions, with music, singing, dancing, alcohol, festivities and fighting involved. A major renovation project in 2016 saw a waymarked path installed across the fields to grant access to the well from the side of St. Kevin's Community College. The well was also refurbished and a new mass rock altar was installed.

Tornant moat
Tornant, or Tournant, moat is a National Monument composed of a ringfort and nearby barrows located 1.3 km south of the town. The name derives from the Irish tor neannta, "nettle mound." The mound marks the site of a large rath which probably dates from the Bronze Age. Later the Normans built a ringwork castle on the site around which the first Dunlavin village settlement grew. Scenic views of West Wicklow can be enjoyed from the top of the moat.

Tournant graveyard
There is a graveyard adjacent to the site of Tornant moat where the majority of the victims of the 1798 Dunlavin Green massacre were interred. In September 2021, a monument was erected at the site of the mass grave which provides information about the 1798 massacre and contains a listing of all the names of those who were executed on the day.

Transport

Rail
Dunlavin railway station opened on 22 June 1885, as part of the line from Sallins to Tullow. It closed to passengers on 27 January 1947 and to goods traffic on 10 March 1947, and closed completely on 1 April 1959 along with the rest of the line. The station building is now a private residence.

Road
Classic and vintage motor enthusiasts are catered for by the West Wicklow Classic & Vintage Vehicles Club. The scenic R756 road leads from Dunlavin to Glendalough crossing the Wicklow Gap.

Bus
As of July 2022, the town is served by three separate 'Local Link' public bus routes; the 1400b, 1410 and 5030. The 1400b links Dunlavin with the nearby village of Donard and Newbridge, County Kildare once a week on a Saturday. The 1410 links the village to Castledermot, Carlow and Baltinglass once a week on a Friday. The 5030 links the village to Baltinglass once a week on a Saturday evening, taking in the neighbouring villages of Donard, Stratford-on-Slaney and Grangecon and returns later in the night.

As of July 2022 the nearest Dublin Bus stop from which to reach Dublin city centre is in the town of Ballymore Eustace 11 km north of Dunlavin where route number 65 runs four times daily (Monday-Friday), seven times (Saturday) and six times (Sunday). From Ballymore Eustace the journey on the 65 takes approximately 1 hour 30 minutes depending on traffic and terminates in the city centre at Poolbeg Street.

As of July 2022, the village is not served by any Bus Éireann route.

People
Raymond Daniels, Wicklow Gaelic footballer (1979–2008) was born in Dunlavin
John Francis Shearman, the historian served as a curate in Dunlavin and researched early Christian relics around Dunlavin.

See also 

 List of towns and villages in Ireland
 Market Houses in Ireland

References

Towns and villages in County Wicklow